Julia Schmidt (born 1976 in Wolfen) is a German painter, living in Hamburg.

She graduated from Glasgow School of Art and from Hochschule für Grafik und Buchkunst Leipzig. Schmidt exhibited at Union Gallery, and Casey Kaplan.

Awards
 2011 Villa Massimo
 2009 Villa Romana prize
 2006 Kunstpreis der Sachsen LB, Leipzig

References

External links
An interview with Julia Schmidt by Clemens Krümmel
"Julia Schmidt", Artnet

1976 births
Living people
People from Bitterfeld-Wolfen
Alumni of the Glasgow School of Art
20th-century German painters
21st-century German painters
German women painters
Hochschule für Grafik und Buchkunst Leipzig alumni
20th-century German women
21st-century German women